Kebbie may refer to
Kebbie Town in Sierra Leone
Brimah Kebbie, English rugby league and rugby union player of Sierra Leonean descent
Elliot Kebbie (born 1994), English footballer of Sierra Leonean descent, son of Brimah